Lawrence Peaks is a mountain complex of high peaks separating the Seafarer Glacier from the head of the Mariner Glacier in Antarctica.

It was named by the Northern Party of New Zealand Geological Survey Antarctic Expedition (NZGSAE), 1966–67, for the leader of the party, J.E.S.Lawrence. It should not be confused with Mt Lawrence, which at 67°51′S 62°31′E, is in the David Range of the Framnes Mtns, and was named after J. Lawrence, a diesel mechanic at Mawson Base in 1959.

References

Further reading
"Mariner Glacier Geological Survey", J.E.S.Lawrence, Antarctic, 4, 9, March 1967 pp 436–439
Weaver S.D., Bradshaw J.D. and Laird M.G. Lawrence Peaks Volcanics, North Victoria Land. New Zealand Antarctic Record. 1984 Vol 5 No 3 pp 18–22
Edmund Stump. The Ross Orogen of the Transantarctic Mountains. Cambridge. 1995
Third GANOVEX expedition, Geological Mapping and Investigations of the Geology of the East and North of North Victoria Land 1982

External links
Geological mapping and investigations of the rock groups in the area of the Mariner Glacier, North Victoria Land
 geographical name data for Lawrence Peaks in Antarctica

Mountain ranges of Victoria Land
Borchgrevink Coast